John Beagley (22 July 1800 – 12 July 1885) was an English professional cricketer who played first-class cricket from 1823 to 1826.  He was mainly associated with Hampshire and made 6 known appearances in first-class matches. His debut game was Hampshire XI versus England at Bramshill, on 14–18 August 1823; his final game was Hampshire and Surrey versus Sussex at Bramshill on 7–8 August 1826.

Beagley was born at Farringdon, Hampshire and died  at Farnham, Surrey.

References

1800 births
1885 deaths
English cricketers
English cricketers of 1787 to 1825
English cricketers of 1826 to 1863
Hampshire cricketers
People from Alton, Hampshire